SD Colonel Templer (previously RMAS Colonel Templer (A229)) is an acoustic research vessel, renamed Seaway Endeavour in 2011 after she was sold to a Swedish shipping company. Between 1980 and 2011, she was in the service of the Royal Aircraft Establishment, the Royal Maritime Auxiliary Service and Serco Marine Services in support of the United Kingdom's Naval Service. Before 1980, Colonel Templer was known as MV Criscilla and worked as a stern trawler.

Her displacement is 1,300 tonnes and dimensions 56 m by 11 m by 5.6 m. Her complement is 14 and speed 12 knots. Twelve scientists can be carried.

Ships history
The ship was built in 1966 by Hall, Russell & Company for J Marr and Sons of Hull. At the time she served as a stern trawler named MV Criscilla.

In 1980, she was sold to the Royal Aircraft Establishment, Farnborough and renamed Colonel Templer after Colonel James Templer, an early British military pioneer of balloons and superintendent of the Aldershot balloon factory. By the late 80s she was converted into an acoustic research vessel, mainly for sonar work by the Defence Evaluation and Research Agency.

After a serious fire in 1990, the ship underwent a major rebuild and in November 2000, Colonel Templer was handed over to the Royal Maritime Auxiliary Service (RMAS) and operated under contract by Serco Denholm, based at HMNB Clyde. In 2001, she was converted to support diving training with the Royal Navy. Following the disbandment of the RMAS in March 2008, Colonel Templer was transferred to Serco Marine Services and received the ship prefix 'SD'.

In July 2011, she was sold to a Swedish firm and renamed Seaway Endeavour with a blue and white livery.

See also
Naval Service (United Kingdom)
List of ships of Serco Marine Services

References

Royal Maritime Auxiliary Service
Serco Marine Services (ships)
Ships built in Aberdeen
1966 ships
Ships built by Hall, Russell & Company